"The Bandit" is a song by American rock band Kings of Leon. It was released as a digital download and for streaming on January 7, 2021, by RCA Records as the lead single from their eighth studio album When You See Yourself.

Background
The band teased the song on their Instagram account on January 1, 2021. The song was written by the band and produced by Markus Dravs.

Personnel
Credits adapted from Tidal.
 Markus Dravs – production
 Caleb Followill – songwriting
 Jared Followill – songwriting
 Matthew Followill – songwriting
 Nathan Followill – songwriting
 Sean Badum – engineering assistance
 Iain Berryman – engineering
 Ted Jensen – mastering
 Spike Stent – mix engineering

Charts

Weekly charts

Year-end charts

References

2021 singles
2021 songs
Kings of Leon songs
RCA Records singles
Songs written by Caleb Followill
Songs written by Jared Followill
Songs written by Matthew Followill
Songs written by Nathan Followill